W3Perl is a free software logfile analyser, which can parse Web/FTP/Mail/CUPS/DHCP/SSH and Squid logfiles. Most major web logfile formats are supported (Web : CLF/ECLF/NECLF on Unix, IIS/W3C on Microsoft ; Mail : Postfix/Sendmail/Exim), as well as split/compressed files. "Page tagging" and counter are also supported if you do not have logfiles access. The output is spread over HTML pages, with graphics and a sortable table. Stats can be run from a single command line or from a web browser.

Features 
Essential features like hosts, pages, scripts, countries, filetype, traffic, hourly, daily, weekly, monthly, referrer, user agent, and error are available along with other specific W3Perl stats like real-time and session stats.

Administration 
W3Perl has an administration interface which allows building configuration files from a web interface. One can also manage configuration files, package updates, run scripts, and see stats output.

Cross-platform availability 
Written in Perl, W3Perl can be installed on any operating system that supports Perl.  As such, it can be installed on Unix, Windows or Mac OS X. An installer is available for Windows and Mac OS X.

Licensing 
W3Perl is licensed under the GNU GPL.

Security considerations 
Running the scripts from the administration interface should be restricted with login/password. Blocking referrer spam have been added but as it is based on a blacklist, the file must be updated regularly. Real-time stats can only run once to prevent overloading the server.

Alternatives 
There are other free tools: 

 Analog is written in C (and therefore very fast) but it lacks some features like session statistics. 
 AWStats has a large user base, is very powerful but still lacks some of the features of W3Perl.
 Piwik is a set of scripts in PHP using a Mysql database.

See also 

 Data logging
 List of web analytics software
 Server log
 Web analytics
 Web log analysis software

References

External links
 

Web analytics
Perl software
Free software programmed in Perl
Free web analytics software
Web technology